Kogon District is a district of Bukhara Region in Uzbekistan. The capital lies at the city Kogon, itself not part of the district.

The district consists of two urban-type settlements (Sarayonobod, Tutikunda) and 9 rural communities.

References

Bukhara Region
Districts of Uzbekistan